Maaike Aarts (born in Amsterdam, March 10, 1976) is a Dutch violinist. She is a member of the Royal Concertgebouw Orchestra, for which she plays as a first violin, since December 2004.

She was briefly a member of the heavy metal band Celestial Season, playing in their 1995 releases Solar Lovers and Sonic Orb.

References

1976 births
Living people
Dutch classical violinists
Players of the Royal Concertgebouw Orchestra
Rock violinists
Musicians from Amsterdam
21st-century classical violinists